David Wheatley may refer to:

 David Wheatley (director) (1949–2009), British film and television director
 David Wheatley (poet) (born 1970), Irish poet and academic
 David Wheatley (composer), composer of music for films such as The Golden Child and Out of the Dark